Daphnella is a genus of sea snails, marine gastropod mollusks in the family Raphitomidae.

Not to be confused with Daphnella Baird, 1850, a synonym of Diaphanosoma Fischer, 1850 belonging to the Sididae, a family of ctenopods.

Description
This genus is well characterised by a small, thin shell, elongate-ovate form, a sharp outer lip, the position of the sinus on the line of the advancing suture, and by the reduction of the siphonal canal. The protoconch has a sinusigerid (or diagonally cancellate) structure. The surface is usually striated. The spire is elevated, the body whorl is elongated. The early whorls of the teleoconch show a nodulous sculpture produced by strong axial riblets and strong spiral lirations. These axial riblets disappear on the body whorl, while the spiral lirations remain. The aperture is oblong-oval, slightly channelled in front. The columella is simple. The outer lip is slightly thickened in the adult.

Species
Species within the genus Daphnella include:

 Daphnella allemani (Bartsch, 1931)
 Daphnella angustata (Sowerby III, 1886) 
 Daphnella annulata Thiele, 1925
 Daphnella antillana Espinosa & Fernández-Garcés, 1990
 Daphnella arafurensis (Smith E. A., 1884)
 Daphnella arcta (Smith E. A., 1884)
 Daphnella areolata Stahlschmidt, Poppe & Chino, 2014
 Daphnella aspersa (Gould, 1860)
 Daphnella atractoides Hervier, 1897
 Daphnella aulacoessa (Watson, 1881)
 Daphnella aureola (Reeve, 1845)
 Daphnella axis (Reeve, 1846)
 Daphnella bartschi Dall, 1919
 Daphnella bedoyai (Rolán, Otero-Schmitt & F. Fernandes, 1998)
 † Daphnella bertrandiana (Millet, 1865) 
 Daphnella boholensis (Reeve, 1843)
 Daphnella botanica Hedley, 1918
 Daphnella buccinulum Melvill & Standen, 1903
 Daphnella butleri (Smith E. A., 1882)
 Daphnella canaliculata Ardovini, 2009
 Daphnella cancellata Hutton, 1878
 Daphnella capensis (G.B. Sowerby III, 1892)
 Daphnella casta Hinds, 1844
 Daphnella cecille Melvill & Standen, 1901
 Daphnella celebensis Schepman, 1913
 Daphnella cheverti Hedley, 1922
 Daphnella cladara Sysoev & Bouchet, 2001
 Daphnella clathrata Gabb, 1865
 Daphnella compsa (Watson, 1881)
 Daphnella concinna (Dunker, 1857)
 Daphnella corbicula (Dall, 1889)
 Daphnella corbula Thiele, 1925
 Daphnella corimbensis (Rolán, Otero-Schmitt & F. Fernandes, 1998)
 Daphnella crebriplicata (Reeve, 1846)
 Daphnella cubana Espinosa & Fernández-Garcés, 1990
 Daphnella curta Pease, 1868 (taxon inquirendum)
 Daphnella dea Melvill, 1904
  †Daphnella degrangei (Cossmann, 1894)  
 Daphnella delicata (Reeve, 1846): synonym of Daphnella flammea (Hinds, 1843)
 Daphnella dilecta Sarasúa, 1992
 Daphnella diluta Sowerby III, 1896
 Daphnella effusa Carpenter, 1865
 Daphnella elata Sowerby III, 1893
 Daphnella elegantissima Espinosa & Fernandez Garces, 1990
 † Daphnella eocaenica Cossmann, 1896
 Daphnella eugrammata Dall, 1902
 Daphnella euphrosyne Melvill & Standen, 1903
 Daphnella evergestis Melvill & Standen, 1901
 Daphnella flammea (Hinds, 1843)
 Daphnella floridula Stahlschmidt, Poppe & Chino, 2014
 Daphnella galactosticta Hervier, 1897 (taxon inquirendum)
 † Daphnella gascognensis Lozouet, 2017 
 Daphnella gemmulifera McLean & Poorman, 1971
 Daphnella godfroidi (de Folin, 1867)
 Daphnella gracilis Kuroda, 1952
 † Daphnella gracillima (Tenison Woods, 1877)  
 Daphnella graminea Stahlschmidt, Poppe & Chino, 2014
 Daphnella grundifera (Dall, 1927)
 Daphnella hayesi Nowell-Usticke, 1959
 Daphnella hedya Melvill & Standen, 1903
 Daphnella hyalina (Reeve, 1845)
 Daphnella ichthyandri Sysoev & Ivanov, 1985
 Daphnella inangulata B.-Q. Li & X.-Z. Li, 2014
 Daphnella intercedens (Melvill, 1923)
 Daphnella interrupta Pease, 1860
 Daphnella itonis Sysoev & Bouchet, 2001
 Daphnella janae Stahlschmidt, Poppe & Chino, 2014
 Daphnella jucunda Thiele, 1925
 Daphnella leucophlegma (Dall, 1881)
 Daphnella levicallis Poorman, L., 1983
 Daphnella louisae Jong & Coomans, 1988
 Daphnella lymneiformis (Kiener, 1840)
 Daphnella lyonsi Espinosa & Fernandez Garces, 1990
 Daphnella magnifica Stahlschmidt, Poppe & Chino, 2014
 Daphnella margaretae Lyons, 1972
 Daphnella marmorata Hinds, 1844
 Daphnella mazatlanica Pilsbry & Lowe, 1932
 Daphnella mitrellaformis (Nomura, 1940)
 Daphnella monocincta Nowell-Usticke, 1969
 Daphnella nobilis Kira, 1959
 Daphnella omaleyi (Melvill, 1899)
 Daphnella ornata Hinds, 1844
 † Daphnella pagera Woodring, 1970 
 Daphnella patula (Reeve, 1845)
 Daphnella pernobilis Habe, 1962
 Daphnella pessulata (Reeve, 1843)
 Daphnella phyxelis Barnard, 1964
 Daphnella proxima Oyama & Takemura, 1958
 Daphnella pluricarinata (Reeve, 1845)
 † Daphnella ponteleviensis Cossmann, 1896
 † Daphnella pseudoconcinna (Ceulemans, Van Dingenen & Landau, 2018) 
 † Daphnella pulchra Peyrot, 1932  
 Daphnella pulchrelineata Stahlschmidt, Poppe & Chino, 2014
 Daphnella pulviscula Chino, 2006
 Daphnella radula Pilsbry, 1904
 Daphnella receptoria Melvill & Standen, 1901
 Daphnella recifensis Barnard, 1958
 Daphnella reeveana (Deshayes, 1863)
 Daphnella reticulosa (Dall, 1889)
 Daphnella retifera (Dall, 1889)
 Daphnella retusa McLean & Poorman, 1971
 Daphnella rissoides (Reeve, 1843)
 † Daphnella romanii  (Libass., 1859)
 Daphnella ryukyuensis MacNeil, 1960
 Daphnella sabrina Melvill, 1906
 † Daphnella salinasi (Calc., 1841)
 Daphnella sandwicensis Pease, 1860
 Daphnella scabrata (Smith, 1888)
 Daphnella semivaricosa Habe & Masuda, 1990
 Daphnella sigmastoma Hedley, 1922
 Daphnella sinuata (Carpenter, 1856)
 Daphnella souverbiei (Smith E. A., 1882)
 Daphnella spencerae Sowerby III, 1893
 Daphnella stiphra Verco, 1909
 Daphnella supercostata (E. A. Smith, 1882) 
 Daphnella tagaroae Stahlschmidt, Poppe & Chino, 2014
 Daphnella tenuiclathrata Smith E.A., 1882
 Daphnella terina Melvill & Standen, 1896
 Daphnella tetartemoris (Melvill, 1910)
 Daphnella thia Melvill & Standen, 1903 (taxon inquirendum)
 Daphnella thiasotes (Melvill & Standen, 1896)
 Daphnella thygatrica Melvill & Standen, 1903
 Daphnella ticaonica (Reeve, 1845)
 Daphnella tosaensis Habe, 1962
 Daphnella varicosa (Souverbie & Montrozier, 1874)
 Daphnella veneris  Melvill & Standen, 1901
 Daphnella vitrea Garrett, 1873 (taxon inquirendum)
 Daphnella wui Chang, 2001
 Daphnella xylois Melvill & Standen, 1901 (taxon inquirendum)

Species brought into synonymy
 
 Daphnella abyssicola (Reeve, 1846): synonym of Eucithara vittata (Hinds, 1843)
 Daphnella acicula Suter, 1908: synonym of Aoteatilia acicula (Suter, 1908) (original combination)
 Daphnella aculeata Webster, 1906: synonym of Asperdaphne aculeata (Webster, 1906): synonym of Pleurotomella aculeata (Webster, 1906) (original combination)
 Daphnella aculeola Hedley, 1915: synonym of Pleurotomella aculeola (Hedley, 1915) (original combination)
 Daphnella alcestis Melvill, 1906: synonym of Austrodaphnella alcestis (Melvill, 1906) (original combination)
 Daphnella alfredensis Bartsch, 1915: synonym of Daphnella capensis (G. B. Sowerby III, 1892)
 †Daphnella ambigua Peyrot, 1931: synonym of †Atoma ambigua (Peyrot, 1931) (original combination)
 Daphnella amphipsila Suter, 1908: synonym of Aoteatilia amphipsila (Suter, 1908) (original combination)
 Daphnella amphitrites Melvill & Standen, 1903: synonym of Taranidaphne amphitrites (Melvill & Standen, 1903) (original combination)
 Daphnella angulata Suter, 1908: synonym of Liratilia conquisita (Suter, 1907)
 Daphnella angulata Habe & Masuda, 1990: synonym of Rimosodaphnella angulata (Habe & Masuda, 1990)
 Daphnella antonia (Dall, 1881): synonym of Benthomangelia antonia (Dall, 1881)
 Daphnella arctata Brazier, 1876: synonym of Daphnella sigmastoma Hedley, 1922
 Daphnella arctata Reeve, 1845: synonym of Daphnella sigmastoma Hedley, 1922
 Daphnella areola Reeve, 1845: synonym of Daphnella aureola (Reeve, 1845)
 Daphnella aspera Carpenter, 1864: synonym of Mitromorpha aspera (Carpenter, 1864) (original combination)
 Daphnella atrostyla Tryon, 1884: synonym of Kurtziella atrostyla (Tryon, 1884) (original combination)
 Daphnella aureolata Reeve, 1845: synonym of Daphnella aureola (Reeve, 1845)
 Daphnella bandella (Dall, 1881): synonym of Benthomangelia bandella (Dall, 1881)
 Daphnella barbadensis Nowell-Usticke, 1971: synonym of Daphnella lymneiformis Woodring, 1928
 Daphnella bastowi Gatliff & Gabriel, 1908: synonym of Asperdaphne bastowi (Gatliff & Gabriel, 1908) (original combination)
 Daphnella bathentoma Verco, 1909: synonym of Nepotilla bathentoma (Verco, 1909) (original combination)
 Daphnella bella Pease, 1860: synonym of Macteola interrupta (Reeve, 1846)
 Daphnella bicarinata Pease, 1860: synonym of Eucyclotoma bicarinata (Pease, 1862)
 Daphnella bicolor (Reeve, 1846): synonym of Eucithara bicolor (Reeve, 1846)
 Daphnella bitorquata G. B. Sowerby III, 1896: synonym of Asperdaphne bitorquata (Sowerby III, 1896) (original combination)
 Daphnella bitrudis Barnard, 1963: synonym of Famelica bitrudis (Barnard, 1963) (original combination)
 Daphnella bucklandi Laseron, 1954: synonym of Daphnella botanica Hedley, 1918
 Daphnella cassandra Hedley, 1904: synonym of Aesopus cassandra (Hedley, 1904) (original combination)
 Daphnella cerina (Kurtz & Stimpson, 1851): synonym of Kurtziella cerina (Kurtz & Stimpson, 1851)
 Daphnella cestrum Hedley, 1922: synonym of Vepridaphne cestrum (Hedley, 1922) (original combination)
 †Daphnella chapplei Powell, 1944: synonym of †Pleurotomella chapplei (Powell, 1944) (original combination)
 Daphnella chariessa Suter, 1908: synonym of Liratilia conquisita (Suter, 1907)
 Daphnella chrysoleuca (Melvill, 1923): synonym of Hemilienardia chrysoleuca (Melvill, 1923)
 †Daphnella clifdenica Laws, 1939: synonym of †Maoridaphne clifdenica (Laws, 1939) (original combination)
 Daphnella conquisita Suter, 1907: synonym of Liratilia conquisita (Suter, 1907) (original combination)
 Daphnella cortezi Dall, 1908 : synonym of Exilia cortezi (Dall, 1908)
 Daphnella crassilirata Suter, 1908: synonym of Minortrophon crassiliratus (Suter, 1908)
 Daphnella crebricostata (Carpenter, 1864): synonym of Mangelia crebricostata Carpenter, 1864
 Daphnella crenulata Pease, 1868: synonym of Otitoma cyclophora (Deshayes, 1863)
 Daphnella cyclophora (Deshayes, 1863): synonym of Otitoma cyclophora (Deshayes, 1863)
 Daphnella cymatodes Hervier, 1897: synonym of Eucyclotoma cymatodes (Hervier, 1897) (original combination)
 Daphnella daphnelloides Reeve, 1845: synonym of Daphnella marmorata Hinds, 1844
 * Daphnella decorata Adams, 1850: synonym of Daphnella lymneiformis Woodring, 1928
 Daphnella deluta Gould, 1860: synonym of Otitoma deluta (Gould, 1860) (original combination)
 Daphnella dentata (Souverbie, 1870): synonym of Daphnella rissoides (Reeve, 1843)
 Daphnella dulcis G. B. Sowerby III, 1896: synonym of Filodrillia dulcis (G. B. Sowerby III, 1896) (original combination)
 Daphnella elegantissima Schepman, 1913: synonym of Asperdaphne elegantissima (Schepman, 1913) (original combination)
 Daphnella epicharta Melvill & Standen, 1903: synonym of Diaugasma epicharta (Melvill & Standen, 1903) (original combination)
 Daphnella eulimenes Melvill, 1904: synonym of Pleurotomella eulimenes (Melvill, 1904) (original combination)
 Daphnella excavata Gatliff, 1906: synonym of Nepotilla excavata (Gatliff, 1906) (original combination)
 Daphnella fallaciosa G. B. Sowerby III, 1896: synonym of Guraleus fallaciosus (G. B. Sowerby III, 1896) (original combination)
 Daphnella fenestrata Verco, 1909: synonym of Nepotilla fenestrata (Verco, 1909) (original combination)
 Daphnella filosa Carpenter, 1864: synonym of Mitromorpha carpenteri Glibert, 1954 (Secondary junior homonym of Columbella filosa Dujardin, 1837; Mitromorpha carpenteri is a replacement name)
 Daphnella fragilis (Reeve, 1845): synonym of Daphnella interrupta Pease, 1860
 Daphnella fusca (C. B. Adams, 1845): synonym of Pyrgocythara cinctella (Pfeiffer, 1840)
 Daphnella fuscobalteata E. A. Smith, 1879: synonym of Kuroshiodaphne fuscobalteata (E. A. Smith, 1879) (original combination)
 Daphnella fuscoligata Dall, 1871: synonym of Clathromangelia fuscoligata (Dall, 1871) (original combination)
 Daphnella fuscopicta (Sowerby III, 1893): synonym of Crossata fuscopicta (Sowerby III, 1893)
 Daphnella fusiformis Garrett, 1873: synonym of Eucyclotoma fusiformis (Garrett, 1873) (original combination)
 Daphnella goreensis Maltzan, 1883: synonym of Haedropleura septangularis (Montagu, 1803)
 Daphnella gracilior Tryon, 1884: synonym of Mitromorpha gracilior (Tryon, 1884) (original combination)
 Daphnella granata Hedley, 1922: synonym of Taranis granata (Hedley, 1922) (original combination)
 Daphnella harrisoni (Tenison-Woods, 1878): synonym of Parviterebra brazieri (Angas, 1875)
 Daphnella igniflua (Reeve, 1845): synonym of Monostiolum tessellatum (Reeve, 1844)
 Daphnella imparella Dall, 1908: synonym of Xanthodaphne imparella (Dall, 1908) (original combination)
 Daphnella itama Melvill, 1906: synonym of Pleurotomella itama (Melvill, 1906) (original combination)
 †Daphnella kaiparica Laws, 1939: synonym of †Maoridaphne kaiparica (Laws, 1939) (original combination)
 Daphnella kingensis Petterd, 1879: synonym of Antiguraleus kingensis (Petterd, 1879) (original combination)
 †Daphnella lacunosa Hutton, 1885: synonym of †Zenepos lacunosa (Hutton, 1885)
 Daphnella letourneuxiana (Crosse & P. Fischer, 1865): synonym of Turrella letourneuxiana (Crosse & P. Fischer, 1865)
 Daphnella lifouana Hervier, 1897: synonym of Tritonoturris lifouana (Hervier, 1897) (original combination)
 Daphnella lirata (Reeve, 1845): synonym of Otitoma lirata (Reeve, 1845)
 Daphnella lucasii] Melvill, 1904: synonym of Pleurotomella lucasii (Melvill, J.C., 1904)
 Daphnella lyrica (Reeve, 1846): synonym of Gingicithara lyrica (Reeve, 1846)
 Daphnella marmorata Verco, 1909: synonym of Nepotilla marmorata (Verco, 1909) (original combination)
 Daphnella matakuana (E. A. Smith, 1884): synonym of Eucithara delacouriana (Crosse, 1869)
 Daphnella melanitica (Dall in Dall & Simpson, 1901): synonym of Nannodiella melanitica (Dall, 1901)
 Daphnella michaelseni Strebel, 1905: synonym of Thesbia michaelseni (Strebel, 1905) (original combination)
 Daphnella mimica G. B. Sowerby III, 1896: synonym of Nepotilla mimica (G. B. Sowerby III, 1896) (original combination)
 Daphnella minuscula E. A. Smith, 1910: synonym of Mangelia minuscula (E. A. Smith, 1910) (original combination)
 †Daphnella monterosatoi Cipolla, 1914: synonym of †Teretia monterosatoi (Cipolla, 1914)
 †Daphnella multicincta P. Marshall, 1917: synonym of †Marshallaria multicincta (P. Marshall, 1917)
 †Daphnella neozelanica Suter, 1917: synonym of †Marshallena neozelanica (Suter, 1917) (original combination)
 Daphnella nereidum Melvill & Standen, 1903: synonym of Taranidaphne nereidum (Melvill & Standen, 1903) (original combination)
 Daphnella olyra (Reeve, 1845): synonym of Diaugasma olyra (Reeve, 1845)
 †Daphnella ovata P. Marshall, 1917: synonym of †Marshallaria multicincta (P. Marshall, 1917)
 Daphnella pagoda May, 1911: synonym of Eucithara pagoda (May, 1911) (original combination)
 Daphnella panamica Pilsbry & Lowe, 1932: synonym of Daphnella mazatlanica Pilsbry & Lowe, 1932
 Daphnella payeni Rochebrune & Mabille, 1885: synonym of Typhlodaphne payeni (Rochebrune & Mabille, 1885) (original combination)
 Daphnella perfragilis Schepman, 1913: synonym of Isodaphne perfragilis (Schepman, 1913) (original combination)
 Daphnella peripla (Dall, 1881): synonym of Gymnobela chyta (R. B. Watson, 1881)
 Daphnella perplexa Verco, 1909: synonym of Asperdaphne perplexa (Verco, 1909) (original combination)
 Daphnella philippiana Dunker, 1871: synonym of Daphnella delicata (Reeve, 1846)
 Daphnella pilsbryi Kuroda, 1947: synonym of Daphnella interrupta Pease, 1860
 Daphnella pompholyx (Dall, 1889): synonym of Xanthodaphne pompholyx (Dall, 1889)
 †Daphnella protensa Hutton, 1885: synonym of †Neoguraleus protensus (Hutton, 1885)
 Daphnella psila Suter, 1908: synonym of Aoteatilia psila (Suter, 1908) (original combination)
 Daphnella reticulatus Dall, 1889: synonym of Daphnella reticulosa (Dall, 1889)
 Daphnella sagena Dall, 1927: synonym of Mangelia sagena (Dall, 1927) (original combination)
 Daphnella sandwichensis Pease, 1860: synonym of Daphnella sandwicensis Pease, 1860
 Daphnella saturata (Reeve, 1845): synonym of Kuroshiodaphne saturata (Reeve, 1845)
 Daphnella scalaris Møller, 1842: synonym of Daphnella nobilis Kira, 1959
 Daphnella sofia Dall, 1889: synonym of Xanthodaphne sofia (Dall, 1889)
 Daphnella stegeri McGinty, 1955: synonym of Eucyclotoma stegeri (McGinty, 1955) (original combination)
 Daphnella substriata Suter, 1899: synonym of Aoteatilia substriata (Suter, 1899) (original combination)
 Daphnella subula Brazier, J. 1876: synonym of Daphnella axis (Reeve, 1846)
 Daphnella subuloides Schepman, 1913: synonym of Euclathurella subuloides (Schepman, 1913) (original combination)
 Daphnella subzonata E. A. Smith, 1879: synonym of Asperdaphne subzonata (E. A. Smith, 1879) (original combination)
 Daphnella suluensis Schepman, 1913: synonym of Asperdaphne suluensis (Schepman, 1913) (original combination)
 Daphnella supracancellata Schepman, 1913: synonym of Kuroshiodaphne supracancellata (Schepman, 1913) (original combination)
 Daphnella tasmanica Tenison Woods, 1877: synonym of Asperdaphne tasmanica (Tenison Woods, 1877) (original combination)
 Daphnella tenella E.A. Smith, 1882: synonym of Pleurotoma clymene Dall, 1918
 Daphnella tenuistriata Suter, 1908: synonym of Aoteatilia tenuistriata (Suter, 1908) (original combination)
 Daphnella thalia Schwabe, E., 1939: synonym of Daphnella allemani (Bartsch, 1931)
 Daphnella thespesia Melvill & Standen, 1896: synonym of Kermia thespesia (Melvill & Standen, 1896) (original combination)
 Daphnella totolirata Suter, 1908: synonym of Zenepos totolirata (Suter, 1908) (original combination)
 Daphnella triseriata Verco, 1909: synonym of Nepotilla triseriata (Verco, 1909) (original combination)
 Daphnella trivaricosa Martens, 1880: synonym of Eucyclotoma trivaricosa (Martens, 1880) (original combination)
 Daphnella trizonata (E. A. Smith, 1882): synonym of Neoguraleus trizonata (E. A. Smith, 1882)
 Daphnella varicifera Pease, 1868: synonym of Eucyclotoma varicifera (Pease, 1868)
 †Daphnella varicostata P. Marshall & Murdoch, 1921: synonym of †Rugobela canaliculata (Suter, 1917)
 Daphnella varix Tenison Woods, 1877: synonym of Marita compta (A. Adams & Angas, 1864)
 Daphnella vercoi G. B. Sowerby III, 1896: synonym of Pleurotomella vercoi (G. B. Sowerby III, 1896)
 Daphnella verecunda Barnard, 1963: synonym of Gymnobela verecunda (Barnard, 1963)
 Daphnella versivestita Hedley, 1912: synonym of Asperdaphne versivestita (Hedley, 1912)
 Daphnella vestalis Hedley, 1903: synonym of Asperdaphne vestalis (Hedley, 1903)
 Daphnella vincentina Crosse & Fischer, 1865: synonym of Guraleus pictus vincentinus (Crosse & Fischer, 1835)

References

External links
 Hinds R. B. (1844–1845). Mollusca. In: The zoology of the voyage of H. M. S. "Sulphur", under the command of Captain Sir Edward Belcher, R. N., C. B., F. R. G. S., etc., during the years 1836–42. London: Smith, Elder and Co. v + 72 pp., 21 pls
 Hedley C. (1918). A checklist of the marine fauna of New South Wales. Part 1. Journal and Proceedings of the Royal Society of New South Wales. 51: M1-M120
 Powell, Arthur William Baden. "The Australian Tertiary Mollusca of the Family Turridae." Records of the Auckland Institute and Museum 3.1 (1944): p. 59:  Daphnella cuspidata (Chapple, 1834) 
 Bouchet, Philippe, et al. "A quarter-century of deep-sea malacological exploration in the South and West Pacific: where do we stand? How far to go." Tropical deep-sea Benthos 25 (2008): 9–40
 
 Worldwide Mollusc Species Data Base: Raphitomidae

 
Raphitomidae